William Kaye-Parry (28 June 185310 November 1932) was an Irish architect and civil engineer.

Early life and education
He was born on 28 June 1853, the son of William Parry, proprietor of the Salthill hotel, Salthill, County Dublin.

From 1 November 1870 to 1 November 1873 he was articled to John McMurdy. He then entered Trinity College Dublin where he obtained a Bachelor of Engineering in 1875 with special certificates in practical engineering as well as mechanical and experimental physics.

Career
He began to practice as an independent architect and civil engineer in 1877. In 1880 he won a competition for a design of a concert hall held by the Royal Irish Academy of Music. He also exhibited at the Royal Hibernian Academy that year, as well as in 1881–1883, 1886 and 1896. He was surveyor to the Kingstown Estate from 1896 to 1903.

He entered into a partnership with George Murray Ross in late 1898 or early 1899. The partnership opened a London office in 1900.

He had a reputation for expertise in domestic sanitation and sewage as well as architecture. He was engineer to the Dublin Sanitory Association from 1883 to 1890. He was consulting engineer to the Ulster Sanitory Association in 1891. He was also university examiner in practical sanitary engineering for the qualification of state medicine for Trinity College Dublin in 1895 and external examiner in sanitary engineering in the Faculty of Technology, Victoria University of Manchester.

He suffered a severe accident in 1921 when he broke his thigh in two places - an injury he never fully recovered from.

In 1927 Arnold Francis Hendy, an assistant in the practice was taken on as a full partner and the firm became known as Kaye-Parry Ross & Hendy.

Death
After living in London for several years, he died on 10 November 1932.

References

External links
William Kaye-Parry on archiseek

19th-century Irish architects
19th-century Irish engineers
20th-century Irish architects
20th-century Irish engineers